Vetco was established in July 2004 and operated through its subsidiaries Vetco Gray and Vetco Aibel AS. Vetco was the result of a consortium consisting of the private equity firms Candover, 3i and JP Morgan Partners taking over ABB's oil and gas division; ABB Offshore Systems. Vetco was made out of companies that have serviced the upstream oil and gas industry since 1903. These companies are suppliers of products, systems and services for onshore and offshore drilling and production, project management, engineering, procurement and construction services, process systems and equipment, maintenance, modification and operations. Vetco was headquartered in London UK, and employed over 10000 people in more than 30 countries worldwide.

Operations

Aibel 
Aibel is a provider of project management, engineering, procurement and construction services, including EPC projects, process systems and equipment, maintenance, modification and operations to the upstream oil and gas industry. Aibel employs more than 7,000 people in 17 countries. Vetco Aibel is along with Aker Kværner one of the largest companies operating in the North Sea, and Aibel's HQ is at Billingstad, Norway.

VetcoGray 

On July 30, 2008, in Egypt's Gulf Of Suez, the company converting an exploration well to full production, converting a mudline exploration system to an SG-1 wellhead subsea system for production duty. The newly converted well entered service in April of that year.

Based in Cairo, Egypt, Agiba Petroleum Company, a joint venture company between the Egyptian General Petroleum Corporation (EGPC) and ENI, produces approximately 50,000 barrels of oil per day. ENI, an Italian multi-national oil and gas company, has operated in Egypt since 1959.

History

VetcoGray 

VetcoGray is a combination of a number of companies including Regan Offshore, Ventura Tool Company, Gray Tool Company.

The Ventura Tool Company was formed in 1930 by Carl and Fritz Huntzinger. Fritz Huntsinger purchased the existing Schwab-Lane Tool Company on Ventura Avenue in Ventura, California and changed its name to the Ventura Tool Company. The company repaired pumps and other machinery in oilfields. It grew slowly through the Depression, but by 1937 had 50 employees and had become well established on the Avenue. Ventura Tool improved upon the existing Borescope, an instrument used for inspecting cannon barrels. Huntsinger had a light added to the tip, and the instrument, which used a wide angle lens to relay images back to its operator, could be used for locating defects in petroleum pipes. This innovation revolutionized the inspection of petroleum pipes for defects. Ventura Tool gradually added new techniques for use in these inspections, and the company grew further. It acquired the Master Thread Company, Pressure Weld, Inc. and Tube Upset Corporation. The company specialized in pipe repair and began to develop a high speed drill in the 1940s.41 It also began manufacturing tools for the Air Force. The company would eventually change its emphasis and reincorporate as Vetco Offshore Industries, Inc. in the late 1950s.

Vetco was sold in the 1980s to Houston-based Combustion Engineering (C-E) and moved away from its original base in the Ventura Oil Field. Vetco Gray was then acquired by Hughes Tool in 1986 for $270mm. Unfortunately for Hughes Tool, the acquisition occurred just as oil prices were collapsing and Baker Hughes, the successor to Hughes Tool disposed of 70.1% of Vetco Gray to Bain Capital funds for just $3.8mm. Bain Capital sold Vetco Gray to ABB in 1991. Between 1991 and 2001 VetcoGray completes acquisitions in Canada, Mexico, Argentina, Venezuela and the UK.  In 2004 he ABB Vetco Gray oil and gas business was acquired by a consortium consisting of the private equity firms Candover, 3i and JP Morgan Partners. In February 2007 GE Oil & Gas acquired the company. David Tucker was appointed as Chief Operating Officer for VetcoGray.

Vetco Aibel 

 Traces its roots to Elektrisk Bureau (EB) and Norsk Elektrisk & Brown Boveri (NEBB) that were founded a century ago. These companies evolved to what today is the Norwegian part of ABB
 A separate offshore business EB Offshore was founded in 1989. Through acquisitions of Seatec, Maritime Seanor and Umoe Oil and Gas as well as organic growth the current Vetco Aibel evolved

Track record 
FPSOs 
 Berge Helene
 Petrojarl I
 Norne
 Åsgard A
 Sendje Berge
 Berge Hus
 Chinguetti
 Alvheim
 Vittorio (Golfinho II)
 Ettrick
 Vincent (Ngujima-Yin)

Vetco Aibel

Topsides 

 Alvheim FPSO/Marathon – EPC Topsides
 Volve/Mærsk-Statoil – EPC Topsides
 Kvitebjørn/Statoil - EPC Topsides
 Ringhorne/Esso – EPCI Platform
 Troll C/Hydro – EPC Semi
 Visund/Hydro - EPC Semi
 Heimdal 2000/Hydro– EPC Platform
 Jotun B/Esso – EPCI Platform
 Valhall WP/BP – EPCI Platform

Products 

 Norsk Hydro, Troll C field. Start-up July 2003. Solved emulsion problems and increased production.
 Bluewater Munin, Xijiang field. Start-up October 2004. Oil production capacity increase.
 Norsk Hydro, Grane field. Start-up June 2005, improved separation of heavy oil.
 Maersk Oil Qatar, Al Shaheen field. Start-up 2005, solving emulsion problems.
 Petrobras-FPSO Jubarte P-34, Test Separator. Delivered 2005, heavy oil.

See also
 List of oilfield service companies

References

External links
Vetco Gray
Aibel

Engineering companies of the United Kingdom
Oilfield services companies
Private equity portfolio companies
3i Group companies